Nekarikallu is a village in Guntur district of the Indian state of Andhra Pradesh. It is the headquarters of Nekarikallu mandal in Sattenapalli revenue division.

Governance 

Nekarikallu gram panchayat is the local self-government of the village. It is divided into wards and each ward is represented by a ward member.

Education 

As per the school information report for the academic year 2018–19, the village has a total of 14 schools. These include one KGBV, 2 other types, 7 Zilla Parishad/MPP and 4 private schools.

See also 
 List of villages in Guntur district

References 

Villages in Guntur district
Mandal headquarters in Guntur district